Raven Klaasen and Michael Venus were the defending champions, but lost in the first round to Jonathan Eysseric and Gilles Simon.

Jérémy Chardy and Fabrice Martin won the title, defeating Ben McLachlan and Matwé Middelkoop in the final, 6–3, 6–7(4–7), [10–3].

Seeds

Draw

Draw

References

External Links
 Main draw

Open 13 Provence - Doubles
2019 Doubles
2019 in French tennis